The Portuguese legislative election, 1852 was held on 12 December.

Results

Notes and references

Legislative elections in Portugal
1852 elections in Europe
1852 in Portugal
December 1852 events